Halo (February 7, 1969 – November 28, 2000) was an American Thoroughbred racehorse and an important Champion sire.

Background
Bred in Kentucky by John R. Gaines, founder of the Breeders Cup, Halo was out of the mare Cosmah (who was the Kentucky Broodmare of the Year in 1974), which made him a half-brother to the Hall of Fame filly Tosmah. His sire was Hail To Reason, the U.S. Champion 2-Year-Old Colt and a great-grandson of the extremely important sire Nearco.

Purchased by Charles W. Engelhard, Jr., owner of Nijinsky, Halo  raced under his Cragwood Stable banner.

Racing career
After having little success at age two racing on dirt tracks, in his three-year-old campaign his U.S. Racing Hall of Fame trainer MacKenzie Miller switched him to racing on turf, where he achieved better results. Although never a superstar horse, Halo raced for four years and in 1974, at age five, won the Grade I United Nations Handicap.

Stud record
After retiring from racing, in 1975 Halo was sent to stand at stud at the Maryland division of Windfields Farm, where his progeny included Sunny's Halo and, through his mating with the mare Ballade, Devil's Bag, Glorious Song, and Saint Ballado. In 1984, new majority owners moved Halo to stand at Arthur B. Hancock III's Stone Farm in Paris, Kentucky, where he continued to produce notable offspring, the star of which was Sunday Silence. In all, Halo sired seven champions and 62 stakes winners including two Kentucky Derby winners. Twice, he was the leading sire in North America.

Halo was pensioned in 1997 and died at Stone Farm in 2000 at age thirty-one.

Offspring
Halo was the sire of:
 Sunny's Halo – won 1983 Kentucky Derby
 Sunday Silence – won 1989 Kentucky Derby, Preakness Stakes, Breeders' Cup Classic. The U.S. Racing Hall of Fame inductee is the most successful sire in the world by progeny earnings
 Devil's Bag – won Champagne Stakes, Laurel Futurity, voted 1983 U.S. Champion 2-Year-Old Colt
 Glorious Song – 1980 & 1981 Canadian Champion Older Female Horse, 1980 United States Champion Older Female Horse, 1980 Canadian Horse of the Year
 Saint Ballado –  won 1992 Arlington Classic Stakes, sire of Saint Liam and Ashado
 Goodbye Halo – filly won six Grade I stakes, earned in excess of $1.7 million
 Jolie's Halo – won three Grade I stakes, equaled track record in winning the Philip H. Iselin Handicap, earned in excess of $1.2 million
 Lively One – won Grade I Swaps Stakes, earned in excess of $1.5 million
 Present Value – multiple stakes winner, earned in excess of $1.1 million
 Southern Halo – Leading Sire in Argentina for eleven years, sire of 170 stakes winners.

Grandsire of:
 Agnes Tachyon – Leading sire in Japan (2008)
 Answer Lively – 1998 U.S. Champion 2-Year-Old Colt
 Ashado – Kentucky Oaks, Breeders' Cup Distaff winner, 2004 U.S. Champion 3-Yr-Old filly, 2005 U.S. Champion Older Female Horse
 Deep Impact – won 2005 Japanese Triple Crown, Japan Horse of the Year (2005, 2006), Leading sire of Japan (2012-22); sire of Gentildonna and Contrail
 Devil His Due – multiple Grade I stakes winner, earned in excess of $3.9 million
 Heart's Cry – won the Dubai Sheema Classic and Arima Kinen; sire of Just A Way 
 Manhattan Cafe – Leading sire in Japan (2009)
 Saint Liam – won Breeders' Cup Classic, 2005 U.S. Horse of the Year
 Special Week – multiple Grade I winner; sire of Buena Vista
 Stay Gold – won the Dubai Sheema Classic and Hong Kong Vase; sire of Orfevre, Gold Ship, and Oju Chosan
 Taiki Shuttle – 1998 Japan Horse of the Year 
 Zenno Rob Roy – Multiple Grade I winner, 2004 Japan Horse of the Year
Team - Multiple Grade I winner, 1998 Argentinian Horse of the Year

Damsire of:
 Coup de Genie – multiple Group I winner, 1993 Champion 2-Year-Old Filly in France
 Machiavellian – 1989 Champion 2-Year-Old Colt in France
 Pine Bluff – winner of the 1992 Arkansas Derby and Preakness Stakes
 Rahy – sired Champions Fantastic Light, Serena's Song and was the Leading broodmare sire in Great Britain & Ireland
 Singspiel – won Canadian International Stakes and Japan Cup (1996), Dubai World Cup (1997). Voted 1996 U.S. Champion Male Turf Horse

Pedigree 

Halo is inbred 4x4 to Blue Larkspur, meaning Blue Larkspur appears twice in the fourth generation of his pedigree.

References

1969 racehorse births
2000 racehorse deaths
Racehorses bred in Kentucky
Racehorses trained in the United States
United States Champion Thoroughbred Sires
Thoroughbred family 2-d
Chefs-de-Race